Bon Bini Holland is a 2015 Dutch-comedy film produced by Maarten Swart and directed by Jelle de Jonge. Starring co-writer Jandino Asporaat who plays five different characters in the film, and Liliana de Vries. The film premiered in Dutch theaters nationwide on December 10, 2015

Primarily filmed in Rotterdam, South Holland, a large portion of the movie was filmed in Willemstad, Curaçao in the former Netherlands Antilles, and it features many Dutch celebrities of Surinamese and Curaçaoan descent such as Humberto Tan, Jörgen Raymann and Tania Kross. The film also features the television sketch "FC Kip" from the 'De Dino Show', for which Asporaat is famous for across the Netherlands.

Outside of the Netherlands, the film debuted in Curaçao on 17 January 2016. Asporaat travelled to his place of birth in order to attend the film's premiere. To date the film is the highest attended Dutch film in the Dutch Caribbean of all time. The film is entirely spoken in Dutch, with small portions in Papiamentu, but subtitles are available in English.

Synopsis 
The film begins in Curaçao, where slick Antillean Robertico (Asporaat) gets in trouble when he is unable to pay his debt to a mafia boss for using his house without his notice. He flees from the island to the Netherlands to his aunt Judeska, where he meets business man Ken Maduro (Dennis Rudge). Robertico convinces Ken to invest in his fake vacation homes on Curaçao called 'Bon Bini Bungalows'. After meeting Kens' daughter Noëlla Maduro (Liliana de Vries) he falls in love with her and is no longer sure about scamming her father.

Cast
 Jandino Asporaat as Robertico, Judeska, Rajesh, Gerrie and Sydney
 Liliana de Vries as Noëlla Maduro
 Sergio IJssel as Norwin and Noltie
 Dennis Rudge as Ken Maduro
 Teun Kuilboer as Patrick
 Hans Dagelet as Mafia Boss Eddie
 Alpha Oumar Barry as Kofi
 Phi Nguyen as Ping Ping

Awards
 Golden and Platin Film, Netherlands: 1
 Golden Film: 2015
 Netherlands Film Festival: 1
 Best Film: 2016

See also 
 Bon Bini Holland 2 (2018 film)
 Bon Bini Holland 3 (2022 film)

References

External links 
 Bon Bini Holland Official website
 

2015 films
2010s Dutch-language films
Papiamento-language films
2015 comedy films
Dutch comedy films
Films set in Curaçao
Films set in Rotterdam